Should We Kiss First? is a 2018 South Korean television series starring Kam Woo-sung, Kim Sun-a, Oh Ji-ho and Park Si-yeon. It aired on SBS TV from February 20 to April 24, 2018, for 40 episodes.

The series was initially scheduled to premiere on February 5, 2018, but was moved to the 20th, with four consecutive broadcasts, due to live broadcast of 2018 Pyeongchang Winter Olympics.

Synopsis
The story of a middle-aged man and woman who have given up any dreams of a passionate romance, but are both afraid of living and dying alone.

Cast

Main
 Kam Woo-sung as Son Moo-han, a bachelor who works at a leading advertisement company as a production director.
 Kim Sun-a as An Soon-jin, a flight attendant who has lost faith in love after losing her daughter.
 Oh Ji-ho as Eun Kyung-soo, Soon-jin's ex-husband.
 Park Si-yeon as Baek Ji-min, Kyung-soo's wife.

Supporting
 Han Go-eun as Kang Suk-young
 Kim Sung-soo as Hwang In-woo
 Ye Ji-won as Lee Mi-ra
 Jo Ah-in as Eun Ji-soo
 Sung Byung-sook as Kang Geum-soon
 Lee Young-eun as An Hee-jin
 Kim Ki-bang as Lee Chung-geol
 Jung Da-bin as Son Yi-deun
 Ki Do-hoon as Yeo Ha-min
 Bae Da-bin as Son I-deun

Original soundtrack

Part 1

Part 2

Part 3

Part 4

Part 5

Part 6

Commercial performance

Viewership

Awards and nominations

Notes

References

External links
  
 
 

Seoul Broadcasting System television dramas
Korean-language television shows
2018 South Korean television series debuts
2018 South Korean television series endings
South Korean romance television series
South Korean melodrama television series
Television series by SM C&C